is a railway station on the Ban'etsu West Line in the town of Inawashiro, Fukushima, Japan, operated by East Japan Railway Company (JR East).

Lines

Station layout
Inawashiro Station has two opposed side platforms connected to the station building by a footbridge. The station has a "Midori no Madoguchi" staffed ticket office.

Platforms

History
Inawashiro Station opened on July 15, 1899. The station was absorbed into the JR East network upon the privatization of the Japanese National Railways (JNR) on April 1, 1987.

Passenger statistics
In fiscal 2017, the station was used by an average of 600 passengers daily (boarding passengers only).

Surrounding area
 Aga River

 Inawashiro Town Hall
 Inawashiro Post Office

See also
 List of railway stations in Japan

External links

 JR East Station information

References

Railway stations in Fukushima Prefecture
Ban'etsu West Line
Railway stations in Japan opened in 1899
Inawashiro, Fukushima